The NYTEX Sports Centre is a 2,400-seat multi-purpose arena in North Richland Hills, Texas. It is home to the Lone Star Brahmas of the North American Hockey League and the Texas Jr. Brahmas in the North American 3 Hockey League. The facility was designed by architect Kent Holcomb and built in 1999 as the Blue Line Ice Complex before being renamed in June 2006. It is owned by NYTEX Sports, a management firm based in New York City and Texas.

Notable Events

References

External links

NYTEX Sports Centre website
Info on venue

Indoor ice hockey venues in the United States
Soccer venues in Texas
Indoor soccer venues in the United States
North Richland Hills, Texas
Indoor arenas in Texas
1999 establishments in Texas
Sports venues completed in 1999